Adrián Lozano Magallanes (born 8 May 1999) is a Mexican professional footballer who plays as a midfielder for UAT, on loan from Santos Laguna.

International career
In April 2019, Lozano was included in the 21-player squad to represent Mexico at the U-20 World Cup in Poland.

Career statistics

Club

References

External links
 
 
 

1999 births
Living people
Liga MX players
Association football midfielders
Santos Laguna footballers
Sportspeople from Torreón
Footballers from Coahuila
Mexican footballers
Mexico under-20 international footballers